Paramahamsa Madhavdasji or Paramahamsa Madhavdas (1798–1921) was an Indian yogi, yoga guru and Hindu monk in the 19th century. He was born in 1798 in Bengal. He was initiated as a sadhu (monk) and entered the order of Vaishnavism. He traveled across India on foot for nearly 35 years for knowledge of the practice of yoga. His notable disciple includes Swami Kuvalayananda and Shri Yogendra.

Biography 
He was born in 1798 to a Mukhopadhyaya family in Bengal in a small village near Shantiopur in the Nadia District of present-day West Bengal. He worked as a clerk in the judicial department but later quit the job. Madhavdas made efforts to learn different traditions. After travelling through Assam, Tibet, the Himalayas and various other places in India, he had an opportunity to have first-hand knowledge of yoga techniques. He was also a follower of Bhakti order of  Chaitanya Mahaprabhu in the beginning and later the Vaishnavism order influenced by Gauranga.

In 1869, Madhavdas joined a large Sadhu community, who elected him as their leader at Vrindavan (now in Uttar Pradesh) in 1881. But Madhavdas was not satisfied with these activities among the sadhus. He was eager to reduce the sufferings of the commoner. Later, he came to Gujarat and started teaching yoga vedanta. He eventually settled in Malsar village near Baroda on the banks of the Narmada River in Gujarat, where he taught the secrets of practicing yoga to a few selected and deserving disciples. At the age of 123, Madhavadas died in 1921.

Madhavdas Vacuum 
A noted researcher of Kaivalyadhama Health and Yoga Research Center, Swami Kuvalayananda, discovered the creation of negative pressure in the colon during nauli, one of the yoga kriyas, for the first time in 1924. The discovery of a partial vacuum in the colon during nauli was named the Madhavdas Vacuum after Madhavdas by Swami Kuvalayananda.

References

External links 
 Who is Paramahamsa Madhavadasaji? at Yogapedia
 Paramahansa Sri Madhavadasji Maharaj at Yujyate

1798 births
1921 deaths
19th-century Hindu religious leaders
Bengali Hindu saints
Indian Hindu monks
Indian Hindu yogis
Kriya yogis
Bengali people
Scholars from Gujarat
Indian yoga gurus
Modern yoga pioneers
Modern yoga gurus